John E. White (December 13, 1873 – September 22, 1943) was an American banker and politician who served as the Massachusetts Auditor.

Biography
White was born in Lawrence, Massachusetts on December 13, 1873.  White received his education in the Lawrence public schools.

In 1905 White was a member of the Massachusetts House of Representatives, White served on the House Committee on Ways and Means.

On July 6, 1911  White was elected by the legislature to fill the vacancy in the Auditor's position, he was elected to a full term in the 1911 state election.

He died on September 22, 1943.

References 

State auditors of Massachusetts
1873 births
1943 deaths
Republican Party Massachusetts state senators
Republican Party members of the Massachusetts House of Representatives
Politicians from Lawrence, Massachusetts
People from Edgartown, Massachusetts